Giannis Haroulis (born January 13, 1981) is a Greek singer, songwriter and lute player. He plays a mixture of Greek folk and traditional Cretan music infused with rock elements and modern sounds.

He was born and raised in Crete, where he learned to play the lute and gave his first live performances at local festivals. In 2002, he traveled to Athens to take part in a concert, dedicated to Nikos Xilouris, which was recorded and released as an album entitled When My Friends Come, Mother in 2003.

He has released the solo albums Around Me and Within in 2003, Winter Flower in 2006, Witchcrafts in 2012 and Twelve Lays of the Gypsy in 2016. Witchcrafts received the Golden Album award, while his 2015 live album A Thousand Times Welcome – Live entered the Greek music charts at the number one slot.

Giannis Haroulis has sung as a special guest on many albums of other artists and has collaborated with some of the most famous Greek musicians, such as Mikis Theodorakis, Stavros Xarchakos, Thanasis Papakonstantinou, Dionysis Savvopoulos, Alkistis Protopsalti, Sokratis Malamas, Chainides, Loukas Thanoy, Christos Tsiamoulis, Manos Eleutheriou, Christos Thiveos, Miltos Pashalidis, Nikos Portokaloglou, Manos Xydous, Minos Matsas, Natassa Bofiliou and many others. He has toured Greece extensively throughout the years and in March 2015 he embarked on his first European tour performing in Belgium, Germany, Switzerland and the Netherlands.

Discography

Solo albums 

 2003: Around Me and Within (Γύρω μου και εντός)
 2006: Winter Flower (Χειμωνανθός)
 2012: Witchcrafts (Μαγγανείες)
 2015: A Thousand Times Welcome – Live (Χίλια καλώς εσμίξαμε – Live)
 2016: Twelve Lays of the Gypsy (Ο Δωδεκάλογος του γύφτου)

Collaborations 

 2003: When My Friends Come, Mother (Σαν έρθουν μάνα οι φίλοι μου) – Various 
 2005: It’s Been Ten Years… (Έχουν περάσει χρόνοι δέκα..) – Miltos Pashalidis 
 2005: Twelve and One Stares at the Dodecanese (Δώδεκα και μία ματιές στα Δωδεκάνησα) – Various 
 2005: The Charmer and the Dragontooth (Ο γητευτής και το δρακοδόντι ) – Chainides 
 2005: The Tickler (Ο Γαργαλιστής) – Dimitris Baslam 
 2005: Cretan Precious (Της Κρήτης τα πολύτιμα) – Various 
 2006: Cretan Precious II (Της Κρήτης τα πολύτιμα ΙΙ) – Various 
 2006: Teardrop On Glass (Δάκρυ στο γυαλί) – Estudiantina  
 2007: Twelve Fests (Δωδεκάορτο) – Christos Tsiamoulis 
 2007: House of Endurance (Οίκος αντοχής) – Danae Panagiotopoulou 
 2007: Agisilagos (Ο Αγησίλαγος) – Dimitris Baslam 
 2007: The Generation of 2010 (Η γενιά του 2010) – Difono, 141
 2008: The Shaman (Ο Σαμάνος) – Thanasis Papakonstantinou, Dionysis Savvopoulos 
 2008: Stars Will Always Be Far Away (Τ’ αστέρια θα ‘ναι πάντα μακριά) – Μanos Xydous 
 2008: Young Songs (Τραγουδάκια γάλακτος) – Μ. Halkousaki & Α. Halikia 
 2008: Cretan Precious III (Της Κρήτης τα πολύτιμα IΙΙ) – Various 
 2010: The Island (Το νησί) – Minos Matsas 
 2010: Small Hopes (Μικρές ελπίδες) – Paulos Sinodinos 
 2011: In The Hatches Of Time (Στου χρόνου τις καταπακτές) – Notis Mauroudis 
 2011: I Have A Plan (Έχω ένα σχέδιο) – Themis Karamouratidis 
 2012: Maybe (Ίσως) – Nikos Portokaloglou 
 2014: View Of Paradise (Θέα παραδείσου) – Alkistis Protopsalti 
 2014: Beyond Formalism (Έξω απ' τα μέτρα) – Vangelis Kazantzis 
 2016: I Stored The Dream (Φύλαξα τ’ όνειρο) - Mikis Theodorakis

References

External links 
 Giannis Haroulis blogspot – Biography
Giannis Haroulis – Interview 2015

1981 births
21st-century Greek male singers
People from Agios Nikolaos, Crete
Greek laouto players
Living people